The 1939 National Football League Draft was held on December 9, 1938, at the New Yorker Hotel in New York City, New York. With the first overall pick of the draft, the Chicago Cardinals selected center Ki Aldrich.

Player selections

Round one

Round two

Round three

Round four

Round five

Round six

Round seven

Round eight

Round nine

Round ten

Round eleven

Round twelve

Round thirteen

Round fourteen

Round fifteen

Round sixteen

Round seventeen

Round eighteen

Round nineteen

Round twenty

Round twenty-one

Round twenty-two

Hall of Famers
 Sid Luckman, quarterback from Columbia taken 1st round 2nd overall by the Chicago Bears.
Inducted: Professional Football Hall of Fame class of 1965.

Notable undrafted players

Notes
Heisman Winner

References

External links
 NFL.com – 1939 Draft
 databaseFootball.com – 1939 Draft
 Pro Football Hall of Fame 

1939
Draft
1938 in sports in New York City
1930s in Manhattan
American football in New York City
Sporting events in New York City
Sports in Manhattan
NFL Draft